The Diocese of Tilarán-Liberia is a Latin Church ecclesiastical territory or diocese of the Catholic Church in Costa Rica. It is a suffragan diocese in the ecclesiastical province of the metropolitan Archdiocese of San José de Costa Rica. It was erected as a diocese on 22 July 1961.

Bishops

Ordinaries
Román Arrieta Villalobos (1961–1979), appointed Archbishop of San José de Costa Rica
Héctor Morera Vega (1979–2002) 
Vittorino Girardi, M.C.C.I. (2002–2016)
Manuel Eugenio Salazar Mora (2016–present)

Other priests of this diocese who became bishops
Oswaldo Brenes Álvarez, appointed Bishop of Ciudad Quesada in 2008
Dagoberto Campos Salas, appointed titular Archbishop in 2018

Territorial losses

External links and references

Tilaran
Tilaran
Tilaran
1961 establishments in Costa Rica